Qaleh (also Romanized as Qal‘eh; also known as Kalakh) is a village in Bonab Rural District, in the Central District of Zanjan County, Zanjan Province, Iran. At the 2006 census, its population was 283, in 55 families.

References 

Populated places in Zanjan County